Robert A. LaClair (born July 21, 1959) is an American politician from Barre Town, Vermont. A Republican, he has served in the Vermont House of Representatives since 2015.

References

External links

Living people
1959 births
21st-century American politicians
Republican Party members of the Vermont House of Representatives
People from Montpelier, Vermont